The Winona County Courthouse is the seat of government for Winona County in Winona, Minnesota, United States.  The 1889 Richardsonian Romanesque building was listed on the National Register of Historic Places in 1970 for having local significance in the themes of architecture, art, and politics/government.  It was nominated for being an artistic manifestation of Winona's prosperous riverboat and logging era.  It was the first courthouse in Minnesota listed on the National Register.

Restoration
The original cost of the courthouse was $125,000. The county offices were relocated to other buildings, and the building was again renovated to repair water damage and to bring the building up to current standards. Insurance paid for over half the cost of repairs, and the Minnesota Historical Society contributed $50,000 for exterior work. The renovation also returned much of the building to its original appearance, including the old fireplaces. The total cost of interior renovation was $5.6 million, with another $1.5 million spent on external renovation.

See also
 List of county courthouses in Minnesota
 National Register of Historic Places listings in Winona County, Minnesota

References

External links
 
 

Buildings and structures in Winona, Minnesota
County courthouses in Minnesota
Courthouses on the National Register of Historic Places in Minnesota
Government buildings completed in 1889
National Register of Historic Places in Winona County, Minnesota
Richardsonian Romanesque architecture in Minnesota